Myron Goldfinger is an American architect, known for his 1969 publication, Villages in the Sun, which discussed the architectural style of the Mediterranean. Goldfinger was the designer of the "elegant, high-style" beachside hotel Cove Castles, in 1985. In addition, he designed the luxury resort Altamer Luxury Villas in Anguilla. He is married to June.
Myron Goldfinger is the architect of the modern house in Long Island featured prominently in the Martin Scorsese film, "Wolf of Wall Street".

Publications
Goldfinger, Myron. Villages in the Sun: Mediterranean Community Architecture. New York: Praeger, 1969. OCLC 53690. According to WorldCat, the book is held in 393 libraries.
Spanish translation Arquitectura popular mediterránea Barcelona: G. Gili, 1993.  
Goldfinger, Myron. Myron Goldfinger, Architect. New York City, NY: Artium Books, 1992 
Goldfinger, Myron The Goldfinger Caribbean:	New York : Artium Books, 2005

References

External links
 
 

20th-century American architects
Living people
Year of birth missing (living people)